YLC-4 is a Chinese UHF solid-state, fully coherent 2D long range surveillance radar, which is mainly used for long range surveillance. The radar has the ability to synthesize data from up to four other radars with a large data capacity, and to communicate and display the data and state of the system through the net to realize remote control and detection. When equipped with height-finding radar, it can perform the function of guidance and providing target data for an air traffic control system. With long range detection range, high reliability and easy maintenance, YLC-4 radar is a main radar in air defense network. The manufacturer of the system is Nanjing Research Institute of Electronics Technology (NRIET)/Nanjing Institute No. 1 /南京电子技术研究所.

Design
The YLC-4 system consist of four components: the antenna, the signal cabin, transmitter and the power generators (2 x 120 kW diesel generators).

Specifications
Frequency range: P band
Range (at σ= 2 m2 and Pf=10−6):
Rmax: 410 km (Pd=0.5)
Rmax: 380 km (Pd=0.8)
Coverage:
Azimuth: 0° < 360°
Elevation: 0° < 25°
 Reliability
 MTBFC: => 500 hours
 MTTR: <=0.5 hours
Other features:
Super cosecant square beam in elevation
Solid-state, full coherent, pulse compression and AMTI technology, DMTI adaptive system
Employing various frequency agilities and low sidelobe antenna (< -30 dB), dynamic factor => 45 dB

External links
NRIET

Ground radars
Military radars of the People's Republic of China